Steve Johnson was the defending champion, but did not participate.

Ruben Bemelmans defeated Édouard Roger-Vasselin in the final, 7–6(8–6), 6–3, to win the title.

Seeds

Draw

Finals

Top half

Bottom half

References
 Main Draw
 Qualifying Draw

Open de Guadeloupe - Singles